Siu Hong is an MTR Light Rail stop in Hong Kong. It is located in the west of Tuen Mun River and east of Siu Hong Court. Siu Hong stop belongs to zone 3 for single-ride tickets. The code of this stop is 100.

Station layout

References

External links
 MTR Siu Hong Station location map

MTR Light Rail stops
Tuen Mun District
Railway stations in Hong Kong opened in 1988
MTR Light Rail stops named from housing estates